The 2023 California Golden Bears football team will represent the University of California, Berkeley in the Pac-12 Conference during the 2023 NCAA Division I FBS football season. The Golden Bears are expected to be led by Justin Wilcox in his seventh year as the head coach. They play their home games at California Memorial Stadium in Berkeley, California.

Schedule

References

California
California Golden Bears football seasons
California Golden Bears football